Turk 182 is a 1985 American action comedy-drama film directed by Bob Clark and starring Timothy Hutton, Robert Urich, Kim Cattrall, Robert Culp, and Peter Boyle.  It is also one of the first movies to receive a PG-13 rating.

Plot

34-year-old firefighter Terry Lynch (Robert Urich) lives with his 20-year-old brother Jimmy (Timothy Hutton) in New York City. They have spent most of their respective lives taking care of each other as both of their parents are deceased. Terry, while off duty, rushes from a neighborhood bar into an apartment fire to rescue a young girl, when firefighters inadvertently aim the fire hose at him. The force of the stream pushes Terry, with the child in his arms, through a window and some four stories down, landing flat on his back on the roof of a parked car. The girl is uninjured, but Terry is seriously hurt.

Six months later, and after countless rejections from welfare, workers' compensation and others, Jimmy goes to City Hall with the letters to show to Mayor John J. Tyler (Robert Culp). But when Tyler rebukes him, calling Terry a drunk, Jimmy promptly sneaks into Tyler's office and pastes all the letters on the office walls while security is diverted by a fire set in a nearby bathroom.

Believing Terry was behind the vandalism (as Terry's name was on all the letters), the police, led by Lieutenant Ryan (Peter Boyle), Tyler's chief security officer, come to Hooly's, the brothers' hangout, to arrest Terry. When Terry, drunk and high on pills, takes a swing at Ryan, he roughs Terry up while Jimmy is clubbed by another officer when he tries to help. While posting Terry's bail at the police station, Jimmy meets Danielle "Danny" Boudreau (Kim Cattrall), a social worker assigned to Terry's case; she tells Jimmy that Terry is hospitalized in a body cast after a suicide attempt.

Jimmy goes to Battery Park to again confront Mayor Tyler at his anti-graffiti speech, but is pushed away by police. After seeing Tyler unveil a giant apple, which slowly revolves to show handiwork by vandals saying "Zimmerman Flew, Tyler Knew" to the delight of protesters at the speech, Jimmy is inspired to start a campaign of his own.

Earlier, the Daily News ran a story about Tom Zimmerman, the city's former public works commissioner, who had fled the country to avoid trial for an unspecified crime. The report implies that Tyler not only knew of Zimmerman's fleeing, but masterminded it, referring to Tyler's ordering a continuation of Zimmerman's trial until after the upcoming election; Tyler denies all knowledge and responsibility.

Armed with this knowledge, Jimmy, adopting the alter ego of "Turk 182", begins his personal battle of wits with the mayor by, among other things, leaving his mark on a supposedly graffiti-proof subway car to be used by Tyler in an anti-vandalism campaign; surreptitiously exchanging an airplane banner ad for one that says "Tyler Knew! Turk 182!"; and hacking into a scoreboard computer (with a friend's help) at Giants Stadium during halftime of a football game at which Tyler and New York's governor make an appearance.

Jimmy's goal to embarrass Mayor Tyler broadens to the point where "Turk 182" begins leaving his mark in numerous places, capturing the imagination of the city's entire population, most of whom revere Turk as a hero. But Jimmy soon develops an ulterior motive for his actions: impressing Danny. When Jimmy and Danny return to his apartment after the Giants game, Jimmy goes back out for pizza, and Danny explores the brothers' apartment. Looking through photo albums in their keepsake trunk, she finds an award for Terry with a nameplate on the front bearing Terry's nickname "Turk". When she finds Terry's fireman's cap with badge number 182 on it, she realizes that Jimmy is "Turk 182". Jimmy returns to find a thoroughly impressed Danny waiting for him in his bed, and the two engage in sexual intercourse.

Police Detective Kowalski (Darren McGavin) opens up a case file on "Turk 182", while Jimmy pleads guilty to papering the Mayor's office and is given a nominal fine. When Jimmy and Danny visit Terry in the hospital, Terry tells Jimmy that he's going to try to kill himself again when he is cut out of his body cast.

After spotting Kowalski and Ryan waiting outside his apartment, Jimmy decides to reveal himself as Turk.  But when he and Danny arrive at the Daily News Building they find themselves waiting in line behind several other crank characters all claiming to be Turk. Just as Jimmy leaves in exasperation he is intercepted by a TV reporter who suggests that if Jimmy is the real Turk, he should give an interview on camera. On the evening news, a reporter reveals Jimmy as "Turk 182", but describes him as a disgruntled civil servant seeking a pension. Angered that the interview was not aired and he is being called a "nut case", Jimmy decides to put Turk to rest once and for all, but he tells no one, not even Danny, what his final act will be.

Mayor Tyler appears at a dedication ceremony for the 75th anniversary of the Queensboro Bridge. Ryan, his job now on the line after the Giants Stadium debacle, clamps down security on and around the bridge in preparation of the ceremony. With all local media on hand, the mayor throws the switch lighting up the bridge sign. The lettering on the bridge, which is supposed to say "Queensboro 1909 1984", instead reads gibberish; Jimmy, disguised in an electrical worker uniform, is up on the scaffolding rearranging the words.

All hell breaks loose when spotlights and cameras catch Jimmy on the rigging; TV stations break into regular programming to cover the incident live, and the rally crowd, aroused by Turk's presence, begin chanting "Turk! Turk!" much to Tyler's mortification. Ryan dispatches all police to climb up in the scaffolding to catch Jimmy, but they cannot reach him because he greased all the bridge's lower girders.

At the hospital, Danny and Kowalski are with Terry when a group of patients barge in with a TV tuned to one of the channels showing Jimmy on the bridge. The news anchor then shows Jimmy's interview at the Daily News. Now focusing on his brother's safety instead of his own troubles, Terry, Danny, and Kowalski go to the Queensboro Bridge to get Jimmy down.  Tyler also catches a part of Jimmy's interview; seeing it was "that kid", Tyler can only turn away from the TV in total defeat.

Still frustrated in efforts to stop Jimmy, Ryan goes to the bridge power house and orders the sign turned off.  But when the foreman, citing union and safety issues, refuses, Ryan draws his gun and shoots out the controls and knocking the power off.  After Ryan leaves, the foreman turns on the auxiliary power. Undaunted, Ryan climbs aboard an industrial forklift and, when in range, opens fire on Jimmy himself. Kowalski, having arrived with Danny and Terry moments earlier, goes to the lift and disables the hydraulics, knocking Ryan unconscious. Jimmy, now unhindered, completes his task, and reconnects the power to the 25-foot-high letters which now read "TURK 182", all to the wild cheering of the crowd and the TV audience.

Amid the cheering, Tyler says to Deputy Mayor Hanley, "As soon as [Jimmy] gets down we're gonna find him and tell him we've been rooting for him the whole time!"

Cast

Then-current and former members of WABC's Eyewitness News team portrayed television journalists reporting on Turk's exploits, including Roger Grimsby, Bill Beutel, Roseanne Scamardella and Tom Dunn.

Production
In 1980 Dyan Cannon announced she would direct and star in the film. It was not made for another number of years, with Tim Hutton starring and Bob Clark directing.

"For me, it's a comedy," said Hutton, "because I smile in the movie... He's very much a kid, a kind of naive guy with a twinkle in his eye who goes around thinking he can get away with everything."

Reception
Turk 182 was panned by critics. It holds a rating of 20% on Rotten Tomatoes based on 10 reviews. Gene Siskel of the Chicago Tribune gave the film zero stars out of four, calling it "a laughably bad, offensive movie with holes in its story that you could drive a truck through."

Patrick Goldstein of the Los Angeles Times wrote, "Just why anyone thought this garbled, improbable saga of sweet revenge would captivate moviegoers' imaginations is a mystery that calls for a studio detective, not a critic ... Bob Clark's broad brush-strokes —which worked so well in his comedies— rob the picture of what little moral authority it might originally have had, turning its characters into sitcom-style bozos and giving the story all the emotional wallop of a light-beer commercial."

Geoff Brown of The Monthly Film Bulletin wrote, "Clark's film lacks even the broad logic required of a wish-fulfillment fantasy, and skewers any conviction Timothy Hutton's aggrieved crusader might have by granting him the omnipresence and magic skills of Superman or Captain Marvel."

Janet Maslin of The New York Times stated, "Timothy Hutton has turned into an actor worth watching in anything — even in 'Turk 182!,' a movie with a sloppily sentimental heart that's as big as the city in which its story takes place."

Clay Warnick of The Washington Post was somewhat positive, writing, "The struggle is interesting not because the heroes are appealing, or because their cause seems particularly valid, but because of Robert Culp's expert performance as the villainous mayor of New York."

In one of the film's rare wholly positive reviews, Variety stated, "Besides its compelling storyline, 'Turk 182' features outstanding performances across the board, with Hutton perfect in the role of the determined unassuming hero. He and Urich are very convincing as brothers with an unusually strong bond, and Urich draws a very accurate and sometimes moving picture, particularly during hospital scenes."

It received two Golden Raspberry Award nominations for Worst Supporting Actor (Robert Urich) and Worst Musical Score.

See also
List of firefighting films
TAKI 183

References

External links

1985 films
1980s action comedy-drama films
American action comedy-drama films
1980s English-language films
Films about firefighting
American films about revenge
Films directed by Bob Clark
Films scored by Paul Zaza
Films set in New York City
Films shot in New York City
Interscope Communications films
20th Century Fox films
1980s American films